Agenor de Jesús Báez Cano (born 18 December 1997) is a Nicaraguan footballer who plays as a midfielder for Managua. He is a Nicaragua international.

Career

He is from Somoto.

Báez started his career with Nicaraguan side Real Madriz.

In 2019, he trialed for a club in the Maltese second division.

In 2017, he signed for Managua.

In 2020, he renewed contract with Managua.

References

External links
 
 

Living people
1997 births
Nicaraguan men's footballers
Nicaragua international footballers
Association football midfielders
Managua F.C. players
Real Madriz FC players
Primera División de Fútbol Profesional players
People from Madriz Department